The Breda A.2 was a small sport and touring aircraft developed in Italy in 1921.

Design and development
An advanced design for its time, the A.2 was a low-wing cantilever monoplane with fixed tailskid undercarriage. The pilot and passenger sat in tandem, open cockpits. Originally powered by an inverted inline engine  of 97 kW (130 hp), a more powerful version was developed with a 187 kW (250 hp) engine as a reconnaissance aircraft.

Operators

Specifications (variant)

References

 
 

A.2
1920s Italian sport aircraft
Single-engined tractor aircraft
Low-wing aircraft
Aircraft first flown in 1921